"Everything I Am" is the first single from Greek pop singer Anna Vissi's debut English-language album Everything I Am, which was released in the summer of 2000.

Track listing
"Everything I Am" (Original)
"Everything I Am" (Almighty Mix)
"Everything I Am" (Eiffel 65 Remix)
"Everything I Am" (Groove Brothers Remix)
"Moro Mou" (No Tomorrow)

Charts

External links
Anna Vissi Official Website

2000 singles
Anna Vissi songs
Songs written by Nikos Karvelas
English-language Greek songs
Number-one singles in Greece
2000 songs
Songs written by Paul Barry (songwriter)